Kmoch is a surname meaning godfather in Moravian dialect of Czech language. 

Notable people with the surname include:

 František Kmoch (1848–1912), Czech composer and conductor
 Hans Kmoch (1894–1973), Austrian-American chess master and -journalist

Czech-language surnames